Andrew Philip Kingsford Osmond (March 16, 1938 - April 14, 1999) was a British diplomat, novelist and the original Lord Gnome, one of the co-founders of Private Eye magazine in 1961.

Born in Barnoldby-le-Beck, Lincolnshire 16 March 1938 son of Kingsford Osmond scion of a well-known Lincolnshire farming family. Educated at Harrow School and Brasenose College, Oxford (1961) Osmond joined the Foreign Office in 1962, being posted first to West Africa where he met Douglas Hurd, then subsequently Rome.

He gave Private Eye its name, but had sold the majority of his shares less than a year after its launch. He returned to Private Eye as managing director 1969-1973 when he increased sales by 160%

Published works 
 Send him Victorious (1968) with Douglas Hurd
 The Smile on the Face of the Tiger (1969) with Douglas Hurd
 Scotch on the Rocks (1971) with Douglas Hurd
 Harris in Wonderland: By Philip Reid (pseudonym of Richard Ingrams and Andrew Osmond) 1973
 Saladin! (1975)
 Plenty

References 

English satirists
1938 births
1999 deaths
British male novelists
People educated at Harrow School
People from Lincolnshire
People associated with Brasenose College, Oxford